The Battles for Plav and Gusinje were armed conflicts between the Principality of Montenegro and the League of Prizren (supported by the Ottoman Empire) that broke out following the decision of the Congress of Berlin (1878) that the territories of Plav and Gusinje (part of former Scutari Vilayet) be ceded to Montenegro. The conflicts took place in this territory between 9 October 1879 and 8 January 1880. The following battles were fought:

Velika attacks (9 October – 22 November 1879), Montenegrin victory in the first attack, Albanian victory in the second attack
Battle of Novšiće (4 December 1879), Albanian victory
Battle of Murino (8 January 1880), both sides claim victory

References

Principality of Montenegro
Ottoman period in the history of Montenegro
1879 in the Ottoman Empire
1880 in the Ottoman Empire
Rebellions in Montenegro